The 2017–18 Primera División de Fútbol Profesional season (also known as the Liga Pepsi) is the 19th season and 37th and 38th tournament of El Salvador's Primera División since its establishment of an Apertura and Clausura format. Santa Tecla F.C. the defending champions of the Apertura and Clausuray. The league will consist of 12 teams. There will be two seasons conducted under identical rules, with each team playing a home and away game against the other clubs for a total of 22 games per tournament. At the end of each half-season tournament, the top eight teams in that tournament's regular season standings will take part in the playoffs.

The champions of Apertura or Clausura with the better aggregate record will qualify for the 2019 CONCACAF Champions League. The other champion, and the runner-up with the better aggregate record will qualify for the 2018 CONCACAF League.  Should the same team win both tournaments, both runners-up will qualify for CONCACAF League.  Should the final of both tournaments features the same two teams, the semifinalist with the better aggregate record will qualify for CONCACAF League.

Team information 

A total of 12 teams will contest the league, including 11 sides from the 2016–17 Primera División and 1 promoted from the 2016–17 Segunda División.

UES were relegated to 2017–18 Segunda División the previous season.

The relegated team was replaced by the 2016–17 Segunda División playoffs promotion winner. Independiente won the Apertura 2016, while Audaz won the Clausura 2017 title. C.D. Audaz won the playoffs by the score of 1-0.

C.D. Chalatenango were stripped of their license after suffering financial trouble (failing to primera division license, their players and staff).

A.D. Chalatenango were formed by business leaders and by the local government, they purchased the license and debts of CD Chalatenango .

Promotion and relegation 

Promoted from Segunda División de Fútbol Salvadoreño as of June, 2017.

 Champions: C.D. Audaz

Relegated to Segunda División de Fútbol Salvadoreño as of June, 2017.

 Last Place: UES

Personnel and sponsoring

Notable events

Point deduction
Pasaquina was docked 6 points for failing to pay over players' wages. However, this was later changed to a fine and Pasaquina were able to keep their points.

Sale of Luis Angel Firpo
In August 2017, Familia Galo, owners of Luis Angel Firpo, announced that they were putting the team up for sale.
The Modesto Torres group was one of three known groups to have submitted a preliminary bid for the club. The other two groups were Julio Sosa group, former president of Aguila, and an unnamed Mexican group. 
The sale was completed on September 16, to the Modesto Torres group for an unknown amount.

Change of Ownership of Aguila
After weeks of protest from fans and criticism from players and the media for Aguila late payment for players, poor recruitment and lack of success. The Arieta group announced on 30 December 2017 that they were selling their operating rights for Aguila and would announce the names of the new owners in the new year.

Primera division boycott
In October 2017, eleven clubs voted to boycott FESFUT and leave the primera division (Aguila were the only team to vote against leaving), causing round 12 to be suspended.  A few days later Limeno, Pasaquina, Audaz and Chalatenango voted to return to the Primera division. Following negotiations held by The El Salvador government between FESFUT and the other Primera division clubs, they returned to the primera division. As a protest of the decision to return to the primera division, Lisandrohl Pohl and Vidal Hernandez resigned as president and vice president

Sale of Luis Angel Firpo for the second time
Owing to financial problem and complaints from fan bases, the Modesto Torres group put Luis Angel Firpo up for sale, the second time for the year.

Notable death from Apertura 2017 season and 2018 Clausura season
The following people associated with the Primera Division have died in end of 2017 and mid 2018.

 Elmer Acevedo
 Raúl Antonio García
 Juan Ramón Pacheco
 Carlos Eduardo Pineda
 Fabio de Azevdo
 Lino Medina
 Axel Hochkoeppler

Managerial changes

Before the start of the season

During the Apertura season

Between Apertura and Clausura seasons

During the Clausura season

Apertura 2017

League table

Results

Scoring 
 First goal of the season:  Lorenzo Frutos for Santa Tecla F.C. against C.D. FAS, 33 minutes (July 29, 2017)
 First goal by a foreign player: Lorenzo Frutos for Santa Tecla F.C. against C.D. FAS, 33 minutes (July 29, 2017)
 Fastest goal in a match:  6 minutes
  Mckauly Tulloch  for A.D. Isidro Metapan against C.D. Pasaquina (July, 2017)
 Goal scored at the latest point in a match: 90+2 minutes
  Javier Lezcano own goal for A.D. Chalatenango against C.D. Aguila (August, 2017)
 First penalty Kick of the season:  Herbert Sosa for Alianza F.C. against C.D. Dragon,  minutes (July 30, 2017)
 Widest winning margin: 3 goals
 A.D. Isidro Metapan 3–0 C.D. Pasaquina (July 29, 2017)
 First hat-trick of the season:   Gustavo Guerreño for Alianza F.C. against Firpo (August 27, 2017)
 First own goal of the season:  Javier Lezcano (C.D. Aguila) for Chalatenango (August, 2017)
 Most goals in a match: 8 goals
 Alianza 5–3 A.D. Isidro Metapan  (August, 2017)
 Most goals by one team in a match: 3 goals
 A.D. Isidro Metapan 3–0 C.D. Pasaquina (July 29, 2017)  A.D. Isidro Metapan 3-5 Alianza F.C. (August 2017)
 Most goals in one half by one team: 4 goals
 TBD 5–2(1–2) TBD (2nd half, September 30, 2016)
 Most goals scored by losing team: 3 goals
 A.D. Isidro Metapan 3–5 Alianza F.C.  (August, 2017)
 Most goals by one player in a single match: 3 goals
  Gustavo Guerreño for Alianza F.C. against Firpo (August 27, 2017)
  Gustavo Guerreño for Limeno against Firpo (September, 2017)
  Armando Polo for Sonsonate against Firpo (October, 2017)
  Gustavo Guerreño for Alianza F.C. against Aguila (November, 2017)

Top goalscorers 
Source :

Individual awards

Playoffs

Quarterfinals

First leg

Second leg 

3-3. Isidro Metapan advanced as the higher seeded team.

1-1. FAS advanced as the higher seeded team.

Alianza won 4-0 on aggregate.

0-0. Santa Tecla advanced as the higher seeded team.

Semifinals

First leg

Second leg 

2-2. Santa Tecla advanced as the higher seeded team.

2-2. Alianza advanced as the higher seeded team.

Final

Clausura 2018

League table

Results

Records 
 Best home records: Santa Tecla F.C. (31 points out of 33 points)
 Worst home records: C.D. Dragon (9 points out of 33 points)
 best away records : Alianza F.C. (23 points out of 33 points)
 worst away records :   Sonsonate  (5 points out of 33 points)
 Most goals scored: Santa Tecla F.C. (40 goals)
 Fewest goals: C.D. Dragon (16 goals)
 Fewest goals conceded : Santa Tecla F.C. (12 goals)
 Most goals conceded : A.D. Isidro Metapan (41 goals)

Scoring 
 First goal of the season:  Daniel Luna for Pasaquina against Audaz, 9 minutes (January 13, 2018)
 First goal by a foreign player:  Javier Lescano for Aguila against Chalatenango, 35 minutes (January 13, 2018)
 Fastest goal in a match:  4 minutes
  Gustavo Guerreño for Alianza F.C. against FAS (February 9, 2018)
 Goal scored at the latest point in a match: 90+3 minutes
  Elias Dandi  goal for Isidro Metapan against Firpo (January 28, 2018)
 First penalty Kick of the season:  Javier Lescano for Aguila against Chalatenango, 35 minutes (January 13, 2018)
 Widest winning margin: 4 goals
 Santa Tecla F.C. 4–0 C.D. Audaz (2018)
 First hat-trick of the season:  Rodolfo Zelaya for Alianza against C.D. Chalatenango (April 15, 2018)
 First own goal of the season:  Nelson Moreno (Firp) for C.D. Aguila (February 19, 2018)
 Most goals in a match: 6 goals
 TBD 4–2 TBD  (August, 2017)
 Most goals by one team in a match: 4 goals
 C.D. FAS 4–2 Firp (2018)  Santa Tecla F.C. 4-0 C.D. Audaz (2018)  Limeno 4–2 A.D. Isidro Metapan (2018)
 Most goals in one half by one team: 4 goals
 TBD 5–2(1–2) TBD (2nd half, September 30, 2016)
 Most goals scored by losing team: 2 goals
 Firpo 2–4 C.D. FAS  (March 12, 2018)  C.D. Audaz 2-3 C.D. FAS (March 8, 2018)  C.D. Chalatenango 2-3 A.D. Isidro Metapan (February 25, 2018)  C.D. Chalatenango 2-3 Limeno (February 22, 2018)
 Most goals by one player in a single match: 3 goals
  Rodolfo Zelaya for Alianza against C.D. Chalatenango (April 15, 2018)

Top goalscorers

Individual awards

Playoffs

Quarterfinals

First leg

Second leg 

Audaz won 4-3 on aggregate.

Aguila won 1-0 on aggregate.

Alianza won 5-0 on aggregate.

1-1. Santa Tecla advanced as the higher seeded team.

Semifinals

First leg

Second leg 

Santa Tecla won 5-2 on aggregate.

Alianza won 5-2 on aggregate.

Final

List of foreign players in the league 
This is a list of foreign players in the 2017–18 season. The following players:

 Have played at least one game for the respective club.
 Have not been capped for the El Salvador national football team on any level, independently from the birthplace

A new rule was introduced this season, that clubs can have four foreign players per club and can only add a new player if there is an injury or a player is released and it's before the close of the season transfer window.

 (player released during the Apertura season)
 (player released between the Apertura and Clausura seasons)
 (player released during the Clausura season)

Aggregate table

Relegation playoff

References 

Primera División de Fútbol Profesional seasons
El Salvador
1